The Serpent Crown is a fictional mystical power object appearing in American comic books published by Marvel Comics. It was created by writer Roy Thomas and artist Marie Severin, and first appeared in Sub-Mariner #9 (January 1969).

Properties
The Serpent Crown is depicted as a crown that resembles a coiled, seven-headed serpent and is made of an unknown material. The resemblance is a reference to the malevolent seven-headed exiled serpent demon/god "Set" to whom the crown holds a mystical link from which it draws its powers.

Those powers confer on the helmet's wearer various abilities. These abilities can include superhuman strength, the power to read and control the minds of others, the power to levitate oneself and/or other persons and objects, the ability to cast illusions, the power to project destructive bolts of mystical energy and even the mental ability to manipulate matter and energy.

However, the use of the crown usually leads the wearer to fall under the mental domination of Set, who then has the wearer perform various tasks which would help facilitate its physical return to the Earth dimension.

Story history

Early history of the crown
Although the first appearance of the crown was in 1969 in Sub-Mariner #9 — which is set in contemporary times — various subsequent stories expanded and developed its earlier history in the Marvel Universe.

In the prehistory of the Marvel Universe Earth, Set exiled himself from Earth's dimension and used his influence to spawn a race of humanoid, sentient reptilian beings that became known as the Serpent Men.

The Serpent Men are depicted as a race that devoutly worships Set and are in constant conflict with the human race. As human societies developed, the Serpent Men began to falter and eventually their race dwindled when King Kull became ruler of Valusia and launched a campaign against them.

Five centuries after the time of Kull, their numbers dwindling even further, a group of Serpent Men ally themselves with some human alchemists from Deviant-dominated pre-cataclysmic Lemuria to create the Serpent Crown, a device which gives them access to some of the enormous mystical power of their "god" Set. However, just as the alchemists and Serpent Men were about to exploit the power of the Crown, the Great Cataclysm occurred. This event was a worldwide natural disaster that brought about the sinking of both Atlantis and Lemuria and leads to the deaths of most of the surviving Serpent Men and the loss of the Serpent Crown for centuries.

A mystical object with many similarities to the Serpent Crown — the "Cobra Crown" — is shown to have existed during the Hyborian Age that followed the Great Cataclysm. A follower of Set called Thoth-Amon allies himself with some surviving Serpent Men and briefly wields this second Crown. Another receptacle of Set's vast power, the Cobra Crown also enables its wearer to control the minds of others. However, it appears that it was much inferior to the Serpent Crown as its abilities eventually burn out and it is apparently destroyed during the course of a conflict between Thoth-Amon and Conan the Barbarian.

The Crown in sunken Lemuria
Many centuries later, the sunken city of Lemuria becomes home to a race of water-breathing humanoids called Homo mermanus. These new "Lemurians" (as distinct from the "Atlantean" Homo mermanus who settled in the sunken Atlantis) eventually uncover the Serpent Crown in the ruins of the city. The emperor of the Lemurians, Naga, dons the crown and quickly came under the influence of Set.
 
Naga's physical appearance is changed from exposure to the crown, his facial features coming to resemble those of a snake and his skin becoming scale-like and green (from the common blue of other Homo mermanus). He converts the Lemurian people to the worship of Set and uses its power to gain immortality, ruling over his people for centuries. Through his prolonged use of the crown the skin color and complexion of Lemuria's population also becomes green and scale-like over time.

Naga's use of the crown came to an end when a rebel named Piscatos stole it from him as he slept. Piscatos and his allies then fled with it to Antarctica, where they develop their own civilization, now known as the "Ancients". This civilization goes on to develop telepathic powers and, though they use the Crown for various purposes, they manage to largely escape Set's dominance by encasing the helmet in an unknown substance which for a time prevents Set from controlling those around it.

However, the malign influence of Set eventually manifested itself, with Piscatos finally becoming a follower of the serpent god, which led him to (unwittingly) cause a landslide which ended the Ancient's civilization. The Serpent Crown apparently remained buried underneath the Antarctic ice until the twentieth century.

"The Helmet of Power"
In 1920 an Antarctic expedition, led by Captain Leonard McKenzie of the icebreaker Oracle discovers some remnants of the Ancients' civilization. One of the expedition party, Paul Destine, uncovers the Serpent Crown (which is still disguised by its encasement in a protective substance). Calling it the "Helmet of Power" Destine puts the crown on his head and immediately received a vast increase of his latent psionic powers and was changed physically into a stronger and larger man than he had previously been. Destine, who is thought lost by the expedition which left without him, then uses some of the Ancient's equipment to place himself in suspended animation. Destine emerged from this state decades later, his powers further increased during his period in stasis.

The crown appears in its original form, worn by Lilia Calderu, queen of the Gypsies, during the time period when Destine is in suspended animation.

The Crown next appears in disguised form as the "Helmet of Power." Calling himself "Destiny," Paul Destine seeks to take over the world and comes into conflict with the son of Captain Mackenzie, Namor the Sub-Mariner. Destine continues to draw on the power of the Crown throughout the story though he is never shown to fall under the overt influence of Set, perhaps due to the protective encasement under which the Ancients had placed the Crown centuries before and (more probably) the fact that the concept of the Crown had not been fully developed by the creators yet.

First real appearance: The "re-emergence" of the Serpent Crown
After defeating Destine, Namor takes the "Helmet of Power" to Atlantis. The power of the Crown manages to overcome the Ancient's protective casing, revealing its true form and allowing Set to once again convey its influence through it. This story is the first true, revealed appearance of the Crown, though it had appeared in a disguised form previously and some later appearances are set chronologically before this one.

The Crown initially takes over the mind of Namor's consort, Lady Dorma, and through her the entire population of Atlantis fell under its control. Namor then dons the helmet himself and, through the strength of his will, subverts the influence of Set, thus freeing his people.

The Crown is stolen and returned by Lemurian agents to the possession of Naga, who it is revealed has remained immortal despite his loss of the Crown centuries earlier. Namor attempts to reclaim the Crown and both Naga and the crown are cast into an undersea chasm and thought dead and destroyed.

The super-hero Serpent Crown sagas
The Crown returns, having been recovered by the rebel Atlantean Warlord Krang, who delivered it to the superhuman criminal Viper. Viper, at this point leader of the original Serpent Squad, then kidnaps the president of Roxxon Oil, Hugh Jones, and places the Crown on his head. Jones immediately falls under the mental control of Set. At the conclusion of the storyline the police and Captain America interrupt the Squad's plan and the Crown is temporarily lost to an underground sewer.

It is shown that in the alternate universe where the superhero group the Squadron Supreme resides, that universe's version of the Serpent Crown has managed to gain control of the minds of many of the leaders of America's largest corporations and even that alternate America's President, Nelson Rockefeller.

The Avengers from the mainstream Marvel Universe Earth travel to the Squadron Supreme's Earth and free many of that planet's people from the dominance of the Crown, during the course of which they briefly fell under its influence themselves. The Avengers then brought the Serpent Crown from that alternate world back with them to their own Earth, eventually losing it when it was dropped into the Pacific Ocean after a battle with the Living Laser. 

The original Crown native to that Earth is then found by Hugh Jones, who is still under Set's control. Jones also manages to locate and retrieve the second, alternate universe Serpent Crown, which he mystically merges with the original Crown to create a new Serpent Crown, identical in appearance to the others, though now possessing the combined power of the original two Crowns.

Using this power, Jones then takes control of the minds of the entire population of Washington, D.C., including most of the federal government of the United States. Jones then comes into conflict with a group of super-heroes including the Thing and the Scarlet Witch. The Scarlet Witch engages Set in a battle on the Astral Plane, which allows the Thing to snatch the Crown from Jones' head, severing his link with Set. The Crown is brought to the US government energy-research facility, Project: PEGASUS, for safe-keeping.

The Crown began to exert Set's influence again at Project: PEGASUS, mind controlling the staff at the complex and eventually overpowering the wills of everyone who works there. These workers then set about transporting other Serpent Crowns from alternate dimensions to the Project, finally amassing 777 such crowns which are then merged to create one giant Crown, which is to be used to facilitate Set’s return to Earth.
 
Before this happens, however, several superheroes, including Doctor Strange, Spider-Man, the Thing, and the Scarlet Witch intervene to once again disrupt Set's plans. The superheroes use the Cosmic Cube to destroy the massive Crown and reduce it to metallic dust, and Strange casts a spell exorcising Set from the Earth dimension forever. However, with the temporary loss of many of Strange's magical talismans, the spell keeping Set's influence from Earth was greatly weakened.

The Deviant priest Ghaur, a disciple of Set, and his ally, the Lemurian Llyra, attempt to engineer his return once again through the use of another giant Serpent Crown. This one, however, was composed of elements that rendered it indestructible. He is briefly successful in bringing Set back to the Earth dimension, as the spirit of the exiled god animates the Crown for a short while, before he was defeated by Thor, Quasar, Thing and Doctor Strange. The Crown itself was pushed into an underground crevice.

Later, Ian McNee recovers the crown from Nagala. Nova is sent to Mars by Steve Rogers to investigate the halting of Roxxon Energy Corporation's mining operations. While fleeing from unknown assailants, he flies into an artificial mountainside, where he discovers, at the top of an ancient staircase, an artifact similar to the Serpent Crown, referred to as the "Thorn Crown". Despite warnings by Worldmind, Nova puts on the crown. It is later removed by Steve Rogers and taken away by its guardian, the Archon.

Invaders and the Omega Sea
In his more manic moments, Namor the Submariner would once again declare an overt/covert war upon the surface world under coaxing by a hallucination in the guise of fallen war veteran and close friend; Thomas Merchan. 

Some years back Charles Xavier would make contact with the land set Mr. McKenzie while living amongst the family of another army brat, Randall Peterson, who would attempt to ease his travel companion's mental instability by using a memory of a fallen friend to console his mania, this instead had catalyzed his bipolar tendencies and would effect his more rabid episodes for years to come. Throughout the decades this guilt entity would attempt to supersede his host to enact a final plan which would turn all the Surface Dwellers into Atlanteans. But he could never exert full control over his mental host, to that end he would effect procedures from behind the scenes by giving private orders to the Atlantean King's troops behind his liege's back; one such order being the acquisition of the Serpent Crown. Speaking as though it will shelter Namor's damaged mind while withholding its intended purpose from his king.

After another bloody incursion of Roxxon mining properties, Namor finds himself growing more and more frustrated with Marchen's double backing on his orders. The apparition reveals his true intentions after their shared ward; Roman Peterson met up with them in private just as the hallucination turned separate consciousness had intended. Using the antique's power to transfer himself into their acolyte's body, whilst taking the Serpent Crown for his own ends.

Marchen, now within Roman's body, would use the crown as a means of commanding the Atlantean Guard to follow his orders over waiting for the signal from their king.

The Marchen/Roman amalgam would use the crown to its fullest effect as the Invaders lay siege to the Atlantean crafted device known as the Spear; a transmatter device that siphons water from an all aquatic world to Earth as heavy rain threatening to drown the world. He is eventually defeated by the combined forces of Earth's first heroes and the crown is later confiscated by Namor after all the fighting had been dealt with.

In other media

Television
 The Serpent Crown appears in the Avengers Assemble episode "Beneath the Surface." In this show, the Serpent Crown is shown to control the Atlantean beast Giganto. Upon one of her Atlanteans posing as a cruise passenger claiming the suitcase from Hawkeye and Black Widow (who were posing as Hydra agents on a cruise as part of their spy mission), Attuma's chief advisor Lady Zartra plans to use the Serpent Crown to free her group from Attuma's tyranny. Following a misunderstanding between the Avengers and Zartra's group, Attuma arrives with his soldiers and uses an eel to snatch the Serpent Crown. Upon wearing the Serpent Crown, Attuma unleashes Giganto on both groups. Using a special sonic arrow, Hawkeye was able to disable the Serpent Crown's control over Giganto. When Attuma is defeated and Giganto is freed, the Serpent Crown is thrown into a deep trench. However, Hawkeye managed to retrieve it so that the Avengers can hold onto it for safekeeping.

References

Sources consulted
 
 Serpent Crown at the Marvel Directory
 The Unofficial Handbook of Marvel Comics Creators

External links
 
 

1969 in comics
Fictional elements introduced in 1969
Individual crowns
Marvel Comics Elder Gods